Hugh Marjoe Ross Gortner (born January 14, 1944) is a former evangelist preacher and actor. He first gained public attention during the late 1940s when his parents arranged for him to be ordained as a preacher at age four, due to his extraordinary speaking ability. He was the youngest known in that position. As a young man, he preached on the revival circuit and brought celebrity to the revival movement.

He became a celebrity again during the 1970s when he starred in Marjoe (1972), a behind-the-scenes documentary about the lucrative business of Pentecostal preaching, which won the 1972 Academy Award for Best Documentary Film. That documentary now is noted as one of the most vehement criticisms of Pentecostal preaching.

Early life
Hugh Marjoe Ross Gortner was born in 1944 in Long Beach, California, into a family with a long evangelical heritage. The name "Marjoe" is a portmanteau of the biblical names "Mary" and "Joseph". His father, Vernon Robert Gortner, was a third-generation Christian evangelical minister who preached at revivals. His mother Marge, who has been labelled as "exuberant," was the person who introduced him as a preacher, and is notable for his success as a child. Vernon noticed his son's talent for mimicry and his fearlessness of strangers and public settings. His parents claimed the boy had received a vision from God during a bath, and he started preaching. Marjoe later said that was a fictional story that his parents forced him to repeat. He claimed they compelled him to do that by using mock-drowning episodes; they did not beat him as they did not want to leave bruises that might be noticed during his many public appearances.

They trained him to deliver sermons, complete with dramatic gestures and emphatic lunges. When he was four, his parents arranged for him to perform a marriage ceremony attended by the press, including photographers from Life and Paramount studios. Until his teenage years, Gortner and his parents traveled throughout the United States holding revival meetings, and by 1951 his younger brother Vernoe had been incorporated into the act. As well as teaching Marjoe scriptural passages, his parents also taught him several money-raising tactics, including the sale of supposedly "holy" articles at revivals. He would promise that such items could be used to heal the sick and dying.

By the time he was sixteen, his family had amassed what he later estimated to be three million dollars. Shortly after Gortner's sixteenth birthday, his father absconded with the money.

In the years that followed, Gortner took a break from preaching. He grew resentful of his parents and bitter over the childhood they had forced upon him. At age 20, Gortner considered suing his parents, but never did.

Career
Gortner spent the remainder of his teenage years as an itinerant beatnik. 

In the late 1960s, Gortner experienced a crisis of conscience about his double life. He decided his performing talents might be put to use as an actor or singer. When approached by documentarians Howard Smith and Sarah Kernochan, he agreed to let their film crew follow him throughout 1971 on a final tour of revival meetings in California, Texas, and Michigan.

Unknown to everyone involvedincluding, at one point, his fatherhe gave "backstage" interviews to the filmmakers between sermons and revivals, some including other preachers, explaining intimate details of how he and other ministers operated. The filmmakers also shot footage of him while counting the money he had collected during the day, later in his hotel room. The resulting film, Marjoe, won the 1972 Academy Award for Best Documentary.

Gortner capitalized on the success of the documentary. Oui magazine hired him to cover Millennium '73, a November 1973 festival headlined by the "boy guru" Guru Maharaj Ji. He cut an LP with Chelsea Records titled Bad, but Not Evil, named after his description of himself in the documentary.

He began his acting career with a featured role in The Marcus-Nelson Murders, the 1973 pilot for the Kojak TV series. In 1974, he made several appearances in film and television. In the disaster film, Earthquake, he was Sgt. Jody Joad, a psychotic grocery manager-turned-National Guardsman, the main antagonist. He starred in the television movies The Gun and the Pulpit and  Pray for the Wildcats, and appeared in an episode of Nakia, a 1974 police drama on ABC.

Gortner portrayed the psychopathic, hostage-taking drug dealer in Milton Katselas's 1979 screen adaptation of Mark Medoff's play When You Comin' Back, Red Ryder?. He starred in a number of B-movies including Bobbie Jo and the Outlaw (1976), The Food of the Gods (1976), and Starcrash (1978).

In the early 1980s, Gortner hosted the short-lived reality TV series, Speak Up, America. He also appeared frequently in the 1980s Circus of the Stars specials. He also played a terrorist preacher in a second-season episode of Airwolf, and appeared on Falcon Crest as corrupt psychic-cum-medium "Vince Karlotti" (1986–87). His last role was as a preacher in the western Wild Bill (1995).

Music career
Gortner recorded an album, Bad but Not Evil which was released on the Chelsea Records label in 1972. It included the songs, "Hoe-Bus", "The Ballad of Spider John", "Lo And Behold!", "Wind Up", "I'm A Man", "Collection Box", "Glory Glory Hallelujah", "I Shall Be Released", and "Faith Healing Remedy (Jesus Is Your Friend)". Vocal backing was by Maxine Waters, Gwen Johnson, Clydie King and Venetta Fields etc. The musicians included Tom Scott, Hal Blaine and Michael Omartian etc. It was reviewed in Billboard's November 18 issue that year with the reviewer saying he was off to a flying start with a Bob Dylan composition, "Lo and Behold". The reviewer also called it a strong debut. The other songs noted as highlights were "Hoe-Bus",  "Glory Glory Halelujah", and another Dylan composition, "I Shall Be Released". The single "Lo And Behold!" was also attracting attention.

Personal life
In 1971, Gortner married Agnes Benjamin, who had appeared in his documentary. From 1978 to December 14, 1979, Gortner was married to actress Candy Clark. Until 2009, Gortner produced Celebrity Sports Invitational charity golf tournaments and ski events to raise money for charities such as the Dream Foundation and Robert F. Kennedy, Jr.'s Waterkeeper Alliance, retiring in January 2010.

Stage play and film retrospective
In 2007, the Philadelphia Live Arts Festival commissioned actor and writer Brian Osborne to write a one-man play about Gortner. The play, The Word, premiered at the Festival with Suli Holum as director and main collaborator. In 2010, the play was recreated as The Word: A House Party for Jesus, with director Whit MacLaughlin. The play opened October 14, 2010 in Philadelphia, Pennsylvania and has been performed in New York (the Soho Playhouse), Los Angeles, Philadelphia (the 2011 NET Festival), and Pittsburgh, Pennsylvania (the Kelly Strayhorn Theater).

In 2008, the Melbourne Underground Film Festival in Melbourne, Australia held the first retrospective of Marjoe Gortner's roles as part of its ninth festival.

Filmography

See also
 Al Sharpton – another well-known child preacher
 Child preacher

Notes

References

External links

The child preacher who exposed a con (BBC World Service Outlook, March 17, 2022)
Resurrecting 'Marjoe' article by Sarah Kernochan.
Interview with Marjoe
Marjoe Gortner(Aveleyman)

1944 births
Living people
American evangelists
American male film actors
Male actors from Long Beach, California
20th-century American male actors
People from Long Beach, California